StarTalk is an American television talk show hosted by Neil deGrasse Tyson that airs weekly on National Geographic. StarTalk is a spin-off of the podcast of the same name, in which Tyson discusses scientific topics through one-on-one interviews and panel discussions. Space.com called it the "first-ever science-themed late-night talk show." The series premiered on April 20, 2015.

Format
The format of the show broadly follows the format of the podcast. This consists of a pre-taped discussion between Tyson and the guest of the week, which is shown in segments interspersed with the segments filmed in front of the live audience. Those segments consist of a discussion between Tyson, a specialist related to the guest's area of expertise, and a comedian (most commonly Chuck Nice or Eugene Mirman or Maeve Higgins). Near the end of the episode, a short taped segment of Bill Nye, giving his view of the episode's topic, is often aired.

Episodes

Season 1 (2015)

Season 2 (2015–16)

Season 3 (2016–17)

Season 4 (2017–18)

Season 5 (2018–19)

Broadcast
In Australia, the series premiered on National Geographic Channel on April 27, 2015.

From November 2018 to March 2019, season 5 was put on hiatus because of ongoing investigations involving the host. At the conclusion of the investigations, the networks began airing new episodes in April 2019.

In popular culture

On August 27, 2015, 20th Century Fox released a viral video advertisement for the movie The Martian, taking the form of a special episode of StarTalk, with Tyson discussing the fictional Ares 3 mission from the film.

See also
 StarTalk (podcast)
 The Sky at Night
 Science communication

References

External links
 Official web site

2015 American television series debuts
2010s American late-night television series
2020s American late-night television series
National Geographic (American TV channel) original programming
Neil deGrasse Tyson
Bill Nye
Science education television series
Television shows based on podcasts
Television shows filmed in New York (state)